Bulcote is a village and civil parish in the Newark and Sherwood district of Nottinghamshire, England. According to the 2001 census it had a population of 330, reducing to 309 at the 2011 Census. The village is on the fringe of the Greater Nottingham area, and is about 7 miles north-east of Nottingham city centre.  Nearby places are Burton Joyce (to the southwest) and Lowdham (to the northeast).

See also
Listed buildings in Bulcote

References

External links

Burton Joyce & Bulcote Local History Society (archived homepage)

Villages in Nottinghamshire
Civil parishes in Nottinghamshire
Newark and Sherwood